= Meteor rock =

Meteor rock can refer to:

- Meteoroid, a small sand to boulder-sized particle of debris in the Solar System
- Kryptonite, mineral from the Superman mythos
